Jamie Broder (born June 8, 1985 in Victoria, British Columbia) is a Canadian beach volleyball player. Broder has qualified to compete (along with partner Kristina Valjas) at the 2016 Summer Olympics. They made it to the round of 16 however they paired up against the other Canadian team of Pavan and Bansley and lost in straight sets.

She played CIS volleyball with the UBC Thunderbirds for two seasons where she was a member of the 2008 CIS women's volleyball championship team.

References

External links
 Jamie Broder at FIVB

Living people
1985 births
Sportspeople from Victoria, British Columbia
Canadian women's beach volleyball players
Beach volleyball players at the 2016 Summer Olympics
Olympic beach volleyball players of Canada
UBC Thunderbirds women's volleyball players